Andrew Jacobs may refer to:

Andrew Jacobs (journalist), reporter for The New York Times and documentary film director and producer
Andrew Jacobs (lawyer) (1906–1992), lawyer, judge, and Congressman for one term, in Indiana
Andrew Jacobs Jr. (1932–2013), lawyer, Indiana state legislator, and Congressman
Andy Jacobs, British sports personality

See also
Andrew Jacobson, American soccer player